YSD-11 Class Seaplane Wrecking Derrick is a class of US Navy derrick crane ship. While listed to service seaplanes the crane was able to lift small boats and large engines also. Hull classification symbol YSD is for Yard Seaplane Dirrick, Yard as in ship repair yard. YSD-11s were used to remove broken seaplanes from the water for repair or regular maintenance. The US had 2,661 Consolidated PBY Catalina built for the war, Canada built 620. Other seaplanes built in mass production were the 1,366 Martin PBM Mariner, 749 Short Sunderland and 345 Grumman G-21 Goose. The YSD-11 Class Derrick was built to support naval operations during World War II, having a displacement of 220 tons no load and 270 tons loaded. The YSD-11 Class had a length 104 feet; a beam of 31 feet and 2 inches; a draft of 4 feet. They had a top speed 10 knots, built with a steel hull. The ship had one American Hoist & Derrick model 685 rotating crane. The crane had a boom of 54 feet with a lifting capacity of 10 tons. The crane was powered by a 6-cylinder Cummins Diesel engine. The ship housed a crew of one Officer and 15 Enlisted men. The ships had a diving gear locker for the crew salvage work. For service power, the ship had two generators: one 30 kW Diesel engine to electric generator and one 20 kW Diesel Generator. Ship power was from two Superior model MRDB-8 200 HP Diesel engines with two propellers, 640shp. The YSD-11 Class Derricks were built by a number of United States shipyards, including Moore Equipment Company, Puget Sound Navy Yard, Charleston Navy Yard, Mare Island Naval Shipyard, Soule Steel Company, Pearl Harbor Navy Yard and Boston Navy Yard.

Moore Equipment Company
Moore Equipment Company in Stockton, California built YSD-11 Class Seaplane Wrecking Derrick:

Boston Navy Yard
Built by Boston Navy Yard in Boston, Massachusetts:

Charleston Naval Shipyard
Charleston Naval Shipyard in Charleston, South Carolina built:

Puget Sound Naval Shipyard
Puget Sound Naval Shipyard in Bremerton, Washington built:

{| class="wikitable collapsible"
! Name !! Built  !! Notes
|-
| YSD 15 || 1933 || worked in Seattle for Navy, 10 April 1984 moved to work at NDRF Olympia, WA, as service craft, to NDRF Suisun Bay as FS 6 struck in 1984.
|-
| YSD 18 || 1933 || Navy sold to Madjic & Sons, Kodiak, AK as Barb M. II (ON 598253) in 1977, renamed Maxine M. in 2009, renamed Mary B. in 2013, working in Kodiak, AK.
|-
| YSD 24 || 1941 || Navy sold in 1960 to Harvey Aluminum Inc., Torrance, CA, later renamed Seahorse working in Pacific Northwest.
|-
| YSD 25 || 1941 || Navy sold in 1974, to International Marine Constructors, Santa Barbara (ON 564392) in 1975, Sold to Ocean Systems, Inc., Santa Barbara as D/B Samson in 1977, scrapped in 2007. Scrapped 1974
|-
| YSD 26 || 1941 ||  To US Army as Coyote in 1975, Sold in the 2000s.
|-
| 
|}

Mare Island Naval Shipyard
Mare Island Naval Shipyard in Vallejo, California built:

Pearl Harbor Naval Shipyard
Pearl Harbor Naval Shipyard, in Honolulu, Hawaii built:

Soule Steel Company
Soule Steel Company in San Francisco built. (Bridge and building builder):
YSD 60 Worked 17th Naval District for WW2, remove Navy 1 December 1977, transferred to the City of Long Beach, CA, 15 December 1999, abandoned on Terminal Island in 2008.
YSD 61 Worked 13th Naval District at Whidbey Island, remove Navy and sold on 27 October 1960 to Western Marine Construction, Inc., Seattle, WA, (ON 284150) in 1961, abandoned on Snohomish River in 2011.
YSD 62 Worked Roi, Kwajalein for WW2, move from Kwajalein to Pearl Harbor aboard Whetstone (LSD-27) in 1947. removed by 1967.
YSD 63 Worked din Guam and Saipan for WW2, worked Subic Bay, remove from Navy 16 July 1993.
YSD 64, became Sandcaster YM-31. Worked Fourteenth Naval District at Pearl Harbor, to Ulithi in 1945, Towed to Kerama Retto, Okinawa by (ARS-16) in 1945, worked Fourteenth Naval District to 1955, worked as Service Craft Unit 1 for diving school at Pearl in 1958, made YM-31 in 1968, rename Sandcaster on 14 December 1968. worked Vietnam, hit Mine on Cua Viet River, Vietnam with 7 Vietnam crew killed on 25 February 1971, remove Navy on 1 September 1972. scrap on 21 February 1973.
YSD 65 Worked 13th Naval District at NAS Tongue Point, removed Navy on 15 June 1974, sold 7 April 1975 to William H. Weber, Long Beach, CA, as Hiawatha (ON 565326) in 1976, out of service in 2005

Omaha Steel Works
Omaha Steel Works in Omaha, Nebraska built (Bridge builder, the only ships built):
YSD 66 Worked 7th Naval District at NAS Miami, moved to Port Everglades, Fl, worked BuAer harbor detection experiments, removed Navy 15 October 1944, transfer to other government agencies on 8 February 1975.
YSD 67 Thru Panama Canal as cargo on ARDC-12 in February 1945, worked 13th Naval District at NAS Seattle in WW2, removed Navy on 15 February 1973, to US Air Force in 1973, to Army Corps of Engineers in 1974 as 'M/V Puget.
YSD 68 Worked 7th Naval District at Fort Pierce, FL for WW2, foundered off North Carolina on 24 September 1952.
YSD 69 Worked 6th Naval District for WW2, removed Navy 1 June 1974, sold to Seacraft, Groves, TX, on 4 December 1974. Sold to Production Aggregate & Gravel, Inc., Port Arthur, TX (ON 587828) in 1977.

Missouri Valley Bridge and Iron Company 
Missouri Valley Bridge & Iron Co. in Leavenworth, Kansas built:
YSD 76 Worked in Reserve Fleet, Green Cove Springs, FL in November 1945, moved to Naval Ordnance Test Lab Facility, Fort Monroe, VA, in 1960. Moved to Naval Diving Unit at Norfolk, VA in 1970. Removed Navy 1 January 1971. Sold for scrap at Portsmouth, VA, 16 January 1971
YSD 77 Removed Navy 15 November 1983, to another government agency on 11 May 1984
YSD 78 Worked Sixth Naval District at Charleston, SC, removed from Navy, to Army as dredge/snagboat, as Snell on 15 August 1960, sold to ACE's Wilmington District.

Other YSD Wrecking Derrick
YSD - Seaplane Wrecking Derrick were given the US Navy nicknamed Mary Annes because of their resemblance to the character in the children's book Mike Mulligan and His Steam Shovel by Virginia Lee Burton.
 YSD-1 90 tons, 60 feet, beam 40 feet, lifting 13,000 pounds built Charleston Navy Yard in 1916.
 YSD-2 76 feet built at New Orleans Naval Station
 YSD-3 not built.
YSD 4,	87 feet, 5 ton lift, built in 1920 at Mare Island
YSD-5 not built.
YSD-6 50 feet, 2 ton lift, built at William I. Huffstetler, Miami, FL
YSD-7 104 feet built at York Navy Yard, Brooklyn, NY
YSD-8 104 feet, built in 1931 at Portsmouth Navy Yard, Portsmouth, NH
YSD 9, 104 feet 240 tons built in 1933 in Pearl Harbor Naval Shipyard
YSD 10 14o feet 240 tons built in 	1933 at Charleston Navy Yard, Charleston

See also
Emergency Shipbuilding program
List of shipbuilders and shipyards
California during World War II
Maritime history of California

References

Ship types
Auxiliary ship classes of the United States Navy